Jodi is a given name.

Jodi may also refer to:

 Jodi (art collective), a pair of artists responsible for the website jodi.org
 Jodi (1999 film), an Indian Tamil film starring Prashanth
 Jodi (2001 film), an Indian Kannada-language film
 Jodi (2019 film), an Indian Telugu film
 Jodi (2021 film), an Indian Punjabi-language film
 Joint Organisations Data Initiative, international center for fossil fuel information
 Hodï, an indigenous people group in the Amazon Rainforest also known as Jodï

See also
 Jody (disambiguation)
 Jodie, a given name